was a Prefectural Natural Park in northern Miyazaki Prefecture, Japan. In 2017 it was incorporated into the Sobo, Katamuki and Okue Biosphere Reserve. 

Established in 1958, the park spanned the municipalities of Hinokage, Nobeoka, and Takachiho.

See also
 National Parks of Japan
 Sobo-Katamuki Quasi-National Park
 Sobo Katamuki Prefectural Natural Park (Ōita)

References

External links
  Map of Sobo Katamuki Prefectural Natural Park

Parks and gardens in Miyazaki Prefecture
Protected areas established in 1958
1958 establishments in Japan